Mizpah is an unincorporated community located within the Mays Landing section of Hamilton Township, in Atlantic County, New Jersey, United States.

Mizpah was established as a Jewish colony in southern New Jersey and was planned out by a New York firm of cloak makers. It originally had a factory, 30 houses, and about 100 settlers.

Uncle Dewey's is a popular barbecue stand located in Mizpah, along U.S. Route 40.

Demographics

Notable people

People who were born in, residents of, or otherwise closely associated with Hamilton Township include:
 Shameka Marshall (born 1983), long jumper who won the gold medal at the 2007 NACAC Championships in Athletics.

References

Hamilton Township, Atlantic County, New Jersey
Unincorporated communities in Atlantic County, New Jersey
Unincorporated communities in New Jersey